Eagle's Landing Christian Academy (ELCA) is a private Christian school is located on an 86-acre campus twenty-five miles south of Atlanta in McDonough, Georgia, United States. It ranks 14th in the Atlanta Business Chronicle of Atlanta's 75 largest private schools. It is a ministry of Eagle's Landing First Baptist Church. Eagle's Landing Christian Academy is accredited by AdvancED and the Georgia Accrediting Commission (GAC). In addition, Eagle's Landing Christian Academy is a member of the Georgia High School Association (GHSA), Region 5-A, Southern Baptist Association of Christian Schools, Association of Christian Schools International, Atlanta Christian Schools Association, The College Board, and the Georgia Independent School Association.

History 
Eagle's Landing Christian Academy was founded as McDonough Christian Academy in 1970. The school had its first graduating class in 1973, with nine students. It was renamed Meadow Creek Christian Academy before becoming Greater Atlanta Christian School – Meadow Creek Campus. In 1994, Eagle's Landing First Baptist Church assumed control of the school, naming it Eagle's Landing Christian Academy.

Eagle's Landing Christian Academy 
In 1994, the academy became a ministry of Eagle's Landing First Baptist Church. In 2000, the school and church moved to the current location. In 2006, the school and church went through a multimillion-dollar building project, adding a new gym, church offices, and cafeteria. As a part of the new cafeteria, the school began using the SAGE lunch program.

Swine flu 
On May 4, 2009, the Centers for Disease Control and Prevention (CDC) confirmed that a 14-year-old student had H1N1 virus, also known as swine flu. This was the first reported case of H1N1 of a Georgia resident. The school was initially forced to close for 14  days according to federal guidelines. All school events – athletic, educational, and fine arts – were canceled until further notice. The CDC changed its policy on school closures on May 5, and ELCA began to prepare to reopen on May 7. 

On May 6, the school had its second case of swine flu. In response, the school began a cleaning effort. School administrator Chuck Gilliam stated,
"We are cleaning light switches, door handles, and other places students come in contact with..." On May 7, the school reopened. The students returned to class as normal, but new safety regulations were put in place to prevent transmission of swine flu by student-to-student contact. The school's reaction to the outbreak was viewed by parents and students as an example for future administrations.

Academics

High school 
Eagle's Landing Christian Academy offers several honors and 19 Advanced Placement classes.

Middle school 
The middle school offers seven honors courses.

Student council 
Each high school grade selects class officers for each school year. The positions include president, vice president, secretary, and chaplain.

Extra-curricular activities

Athletics 
Eagle's Landing Christian Academy joined the Georgia High School Association (GHSA) in 2006, in region 5-A Private. ELCA has an excellent GHSA program, with twelve GHSA Class A State Championships.

State Championships 
 Baseball - 2006, 2013
 Softball - 2006, 2007, 2008, 2009, 2013, 2014, 2015
 Volleyball - 2011
 Football - 1996, 2012, 2015, 2016, 2017, 2018, 2019
 Track & field
 Boys' 4x100 relay - 2012, 2013
 Girls' team - 2014

Fine Arts 
Eagles Landing Christian Academy has a fine arts program including Art, Band (Marching, Praise, Symphonic), Chorus, Drama and Guitar.

Drama team won regions in 2012 with their show A Few Good Men.

Eagles Landing Christian Academy has performed shows including Pocahontas, The Sound of Music, The Wizard of Oz, Annie, Seven Brides for Seven Brothers, and the 2015 spring musical Oliver.

In conjunction with Eagle's Landing First Baptist Church, ELCA has performed Christmastime productions of MTI's (Music Theater International) musicals A Christmas Carol (2017 & 2018) and Annie (2019) with local actor and school Drama Instructor and Head of Fine Arts, Chuck Ekstedt, directing. Academy students, parents, and church members collaborated in all cast and crew roles.

Notable alumni 
 Daz Cameron, MLB professional baseball outfielder
 Isaac Rochell, NFL defensive lineman
 Jacob Heyward, professional baseball outfielder

References

External links 
 Eagle's Landing Christian Academy

Baptist schools in the United States
Christian schools in Georgia (U.S. state)
Private high schools in Georgia (U.S. state)
Schools in Henry County, Georgia
Private middle schools in Georgia (U.S. state)